The Mandalay Bay Tram is a  people mover that opened on April 9, 1999 on the Las Vegas Strip in Paradise, Nevada. It was constructed to connect three gaming hotels belonging to the MGM Mirage Group. The line carries passengers from the major Tropicana – Las Vegas Boulevard intersection, via the Excalibur Hotel and Casino and Luxor Hotel to the Mandalay Bay Resort and Casino at the southern end.

The dual-track system is cable driven and free for the public to use.  The eastern track has intermediate station stops. The western track only has stops at either end of the line – Mandalay Bay and Excalibur. If only one train is running, it is the eastern track and it runs express to Mandalay Bay going south, but makes all stops returning north. During peak periods when both trains are running, they will both stop at all stations along its track.

Description

The Mandalay Bay Tram is a Cable Liner Shuttle installation consisting of an elevated  guideway with two completely independent shuttle systems running side-by-side.
One system serves all four stations along the route, while the other provides an express link between the two end stations.

Each system consists of one train with five cars. The individual cars carry 32 passengers each, thus each train has a total capacity of 160 passengers. System 1 carries 1,300 passengers per hour per direction (pphpd) and has four stations; system 2 carries 1,900 pphpd, and has two stations (and four passengers per square meter). The trains run back empty in the opposite direction between each passenger-carrying run. In the first year of operation, the system carried approximately 21 million passengers. The train cars are firmly attached to a haul rope and run on pneumatic tires to ensure extremely quiet operation. The custom train design is one of the highlights; the trains have been filmed for television commercials, and the Mandalay Bay Group patented the design.

History

The Mandalay Bay Tram project was started on September 2, 1998, when the contract with DCC Doppelmayr Cable Car was signed.  The Cable Liner Shuttle was completed in April 1999, after only nine months from the notice to proceed and had a contract amount of US$16 million.

Operations

There are two independent  shuttle systems side-by-side, built on an elevated modular steel truss guideway. The five-car trains are propelled by stationary drive machinery, controlling train acceleration, speed, propulsion and braking. The headway is 220 seconds and the dwell time is 50 seconds.

Each of the two tracks has its own independent  diameter wire rope, containing a single splice to make it into a loop.  The wire was manufactured by Austria Draht Wire Rope then spliced and tested in situ by Richard Ryer Incorporated.

The tram runs during the hours of 10:00 am and 12:00 am daily.

See also

 Las Vegas Monorail
 Aria Express
 Mirage-Treasure Island tram

References

External links 
 DCC Doppelmayr Cable Car, designers' website
 Doppelmayr/Garaventa Group, parent company of DCC.
 The full journey in video with an interactive map on Kinomap.

Cable Liner people movers
Transportation in the Las Vegas Valley
Las Vegas Strip
Railway lines opened in 1999
Cable railways in the United States
Tram
1999 establishments in Nevada
Passenger rail transportation in Nevada